Trehan is a Punjabi Khatri clan. Before the partition of India, they were found near Mongowal town in Gujrat district of West Punjab. Trehan Khatris of Mangowal are described as "full of endurance , bodily strong and full of conviction" in Sikh texts. Many Trehans were settled in Batala as well. 2nd Guru of Sikhism, the successor of Guru Nanak was Guru Angad, a Trehan Khatri.

Notable people 

 Anuja Trehan Kapur, Indian criminal psychologist
 Madhu Trehan, co-founder of Newslaundary
 Naresh Trehan, Indian cardiovascular and cardiothoracic surgeon and director at Medanta
 Surindar Kumar Trehan, Indian mathematician
 Sushila Chain Trehan, freedom fighter and women activist

References 

Surnames
Indian surnames
Surnames of Indian origin
Punjabi-language surnames
Hindu surnames
Khatri clans
Khatri surnames